Gail is a masculine and feminine given name. 

As a feminine name, it can be a short form of the Biblical name Abigail. 

Gail has been used as a masculine and feminine name, and until the 1930s, was equally rare on either sex. Between the 1930s and 1960s its use as a feminine name increased, as a consequence marginalizing masculine usage by about 1960.

Alternate spellings include Gaile, Gale, and Gayle.

Notable people with the given name include:

Gail Boggs (born 1951), American actress
Gail Borden (1801–1874), American inventor
Gail Borden (figure skater) (1907–1991), American figure skater
 Gail Brodsky (born 1991), American tennis player
Gail Bruce (1923–1998), American football player
Gail Collins (born 1945), American journalist
Gail Cronauer (born 1948), American actress
Gail Davies, (born 1948), American country singer/songwriter
Gail Devers (born 1966), American athlete
Gail Ann Dorsey (born 1962), American musician
Gail Emms (born 1977), British badminton player
Gail Finney (1959-2022), American businesswoman and politician
Gail Fisher (1935–2000), American actress
Gail Goodrich (born 1943), American basketball player
Gail Grandchamp (born 1955), American boxer
Gail Halvorsen (1920–2022), American air force pilot
Gail Jonson (born 1965), New Zealand swimmer
Gail Kim (born 1976), Canadian wrestler
Gail Carson Levine (born 1947), American writer
Gail Nkoane Mabalane (born 1984), South African actress and model
Gail Miller (water polo) (born 1976), Australian water polo player
Gail Minault (born 1939), American historian 
Gail O'Grady (born 1963), American actress
Gail Phillips (1944–2021), American politician
Gail Porter (born 1971), British television presenter
Gail Ryan (born 1939), American hairstylist 
Gail Sheehy (born 1937), American writer
Gail Simmons (born 1976), Canadian food critic
Gail Simone (born 1974), American comics writer
Gail Skare (born 1939), American politician

Fictional characters
 Gail, fictional comics character created by French cartoonist Philippe Druillet
 Gail, fictional character in the 1999 video game Dino Crisis
 Gail Leery, fictional character in the television series Dawson's Creek
 Gail Platt, fictional character in the television series Coronation Street
 Gail Wynand, fictional character in the 1943 novel The Fountainhead by Ayn Rand
Gail Peck, a fictional character from the TV series Rookie Blue

See also
Gaël (given name)
Gale (given name)
Gayle (given name)

References

English feminine given names